3360 or variant, may refer to:

In general
 A.D. 3360, a year in the 4th millennium CE
 3360 BC, a year in the 4th millennium BCE
 3360, a number in the 3000 (number) range

Other uses
 3360 Syrinx, a near-Mars asteroid, the 3360th asteroid registered
 Nokia 3360, a cellphone
 Texas Farm to Market Road 3360, a state highway

See also

 

Lists of ambiguous numbers